Eupithecia assectata is a moth in the family Geometridae. It is found in Uzbekistan, Tajikistan, Kyrgyzstan, Afghanistan and Kashmir. It is  found at altitudes between 2,350 and 3,750 meters.

It is a very variable species. The forewings vary from pale grey without a pattern to dark grey with very distinct blackish transverse lines on the forewings.

References

Moths described in 1904
assectata
Moths of Asia